Mehak Malik is a Pakistani dancer, TikToker, and stage actor active in Punjabi theatre. As a dancer, she specializes in Mujra dance.

Biography
Malik was born in Gojra, Toba Tek Singh District, Punjab, Pakistan. Her parents migrated from district Ludhiana.

She has performed in Multan, Punjab, Pakistan. On TikTok, she has 2.8 million followers.

See also
 Rimal Ali

References

External links

Living people
1995 births
Pakistani LGBT actors
Pakistani transgender people
TikTokers
Pakistani TikTokers
Punjabi people
Pakistani dancers
Pakistani stage actresses
Transgender women
Transgender dancers
Transgender Muslims
LGBT TikTokers